Manaovasoa is political party in Madagascar. The party chairman is Manan'Ignace Rakotomalala, formerly leader of the AKFM party.

For the 2007 parliamentary election, Manaovasoa formed the alliance TMM with MONIMA and Tambatra.

Political parties in Madagascar